Shri. K.K. Balakrishnan (20 June 1927 – 31 August 2000), senior Congress leader, He was a minister in various governments led by K. Karunakaran and A. K. Antony. He represented Chalakkudy, Chelakkara, Thrithala constituencies in different Kerala Legislative Assemblies. He was a minister in the Government of Kerala, holding various portfolios including Irrigation, Transport, Devaswom and Harijan welfare.

Early life
Shri. K.K. Balakrishnan, senior Congress leader, was born at Nedupuzha, in Trichur district on 20 June 1927 as the son of Shri. Karappakutty. He completed intermediate Course, and a Training Course in Khadi & Village Industries. Entering public life while a student, as a worker of the Indian National Congress.

The late Smt. P.C. Rugmini was his wife and they have one son and four daughters.

Shri.K.K Balakrishnan died on 31 August 2000. Kerala Legislative Assembly paid its homage to him on 21 December 2000.

Political career
He started his political career at Indian National Congress,later became Executive member, KPCC, Member, AICC and Organising Secretary, Kerala INTUC.

Shri. Balakrishnan became elected to the Travancore – Cochin Legislative Assembly in 1954 and subsequently to the Second Kerala Legislative Assembly in 1960 from Chalakudy, as an INC candidate. In 1970, 1977 and 1980 he was elected from Chelakkara, in 1982 from Trithala and in 1991 from Vaikom constituency.

Shri Balakrishnan served as the Minister for Irrigation, Harijan Welfare a during 1977 –78, in the Ministries headed by Shri. K. Karunakaran and Shri. A.K. Antony. Later, from 24 May 1982 to 29 August 1983, he was the Minister for Transport, in the Ministry headed by Shri. K. Karunakaran.

Positions held
 Chief Whip, Congress Legislature Party
 Convenor, Opposition Parties Joint Executive Committee
 Chairman, Committee on the Welfare of SC and ST during 1973–74, and 1979–81.
 General Secretary and later President,State Depressed class League
 Director, District Co-operative Bank, Trichur
 Member, Agricultural Production Committee,
 Member, Calicut University Senate.

Assembly election candidature history

See also
 Department of Devaswom, Government of Kerala

References 

1927 births
2000 deaths
Indian National Congress politicians from Kerala
People from Thrissur district
Travancore–Cochin MLAs 1954–1956
Kerala MLAs 1960–1964
Kerala MLAs 1967–1970
Kerala MLAs 1970–1977
Kerala MLAs 1977–1979
Kerala MLAs 1980–1982
Kerala MLAs 1982–1987
Kerala MLAs 1991–1996